Tagarrosa is a hamlet located in the municipality of Melgar de Fernamental, in Burgos province, Castile and León, Spain. As of 2020, it has a population of 10.

Geography 
Tagarrosa is located 58km west-northwest of Burgos.

References

Populated places in the Province of Burgos